From Out of the Blue is an album by the Philadelphia soul group Blue Magic, released in 1989. It was regarded as a comeback album.

The songs "Romeo and Juliet" and "It's Like Magic" were top 40 hits on the Hot R&B Singles chart. "Romeo and Juliet" peaked at No. 89 on the UK Singles Chart.

Production
The album was produced by Vincent Bell and Alvin Moody. It was released via OBR Records, a Def Jam subsidiary that concentrated on R&B and soul.

Critical reception

The Washington Post called the album the group's best to date, writing: "Ted Mills's falsetto is still unearthly; his three bandmates are still super-smooth; and this is the most consistent collection of songs they've ever had. Great falsetto singers such as Mills, Russell Thompkins Jr. of the Stylistics and Eddie Kendricks of the Temptations take the high-pitched excitement of a man in ecstasy and transform it into a permanent state of grace." The Chicago Tribune called it "a fine comeback for one of R&B's most promising but unfulfilled groups."

Track listing

References

1989 albums
Blue Magic (band) albums